is a Japanese light novel series written by Namekojirushi and illustrated by Nao Watanuki, which has been published by Hobby Japan under their HJ Bunko imprint since June 2011.

A manga adaptation drawn by Kouji Hasegawa was serialized in Comic Dangan. J-Novel Club has licensed the novels in North America.

Plot
Rekka Namidare was a normal boy until his sixteenth birthday. Then a girl suddenly appears from his future, warning him that he'll somehow start an interstellar war! It turns out Rekka hails from a special bloodline that's destined to get caught up in all kinds of trouble. Whenever a story's heroine is in dire need, Rekka will be given one last chance to save her. And in the future, Rekka will have saved so many girls that their zealous love for him will cause the apocalypse!

Characters

Media

Light novel
The light novels are written by Namekojirushi and illustrated by Nao Watanuki, and are published by Hobby Japan. Online English light novel publisher J-Novel Club announced their acquisition of the series on October 28, 2016.

Manga

References

External links
I Saved Too Many Girls and Caused the Apocalypse (novel) at J-Novel Club (English publisher)

2011 Japanese novels
HJ Bunko
Hobby Japan manga
J-Novel Club books
Light novels
Seinen manga